Sequoyah High School is the name of a high school found in several different locations in the United States:
 Sequoyah High School (Georgia) in Canton, Georgia
 Sequoyah High School (DeKalb County, Georgia) 1965-1988, (currently Sequoyah Middle School)
 Sequoyah High School (Cherokee County, Oklahoma), a high school and Native American boarding school in Tahlequah, Oklahoma
 Sequoyah High School (Claremore, Oklahoma) in Claremore, Oklahoma
 Sequoyah High School (Tennessee) in Madisonville, Tennessee

See also
 Sequoia High School (disambiguation)